The Crime Victims' Rights Act, (CVRA) 18 U.S.C. § 3771, is part of the United States Justice for All Act of 2004, Pub. L. No. 108-405, 118 Stat. 2260 (effective Oct. 30, 2004). The CVRA enumerates the rights afforded to victims in federal criminal cases. The Act grants victims the following eight rights:

 The right to be reasonably protected from the accused.
 The right to reasonable, accurate, and timely notice of any public court proceeding, or any parole proceeding, involving the crime or of any release or escape of the accused.
 The right not to be excluded from any such public court proceeding, unless the court, after receiving clear and convincing evidence, determines that testimony by the victim would be materially altered if the victim heard other testimony at that proceeding.
 The right to be reasonably heard at any public proceeding in the district court involving release, plea, sentencing, or any parole proceeding.
 The reasonable right to confer with the attorney for the Government in the case.
 The right to full and timely restitution as provided in law.
 The right to proceedings free from unreasonable delay.
 The right to be treated with fairness and with respect for the victim’s dignity and privacy.

The Crime Victims' Rights Act was named for murder victims Scott Campbell, Stephanie Roper, Wendy Preston, Louarna Gillis, and Nila Lynn.

References

External links
 The Crime Victims Rights Act of 2004 and the Federal Courts

United States federal criminal legislation
Victims' rights
Acts of the 108th United States Congress